William Birdlip (fl. 1402–1417) of Gloucester, was an English politician.

He was a Member (MP) of the Parliament of England for Gloucester in 1402, 1411 and 1417.

References

Year of birth missing
Year of death missing
15th-century English people
People from Gloucester
Members of the Parliament of England (pre-1707) for Gloucester